Museum Hill Historic District is a national historic district located at St. Joseph, Missouri. The district encompasses 248 contributing buildings in a predominantly residential section of St. Joseph. It developed between about 1860 and 1942, and includes representative examples of Italianate, Second Empire, Queen Anne, Tudor Revival, American Foursquare, and Bungalow / American Craftsman style architecture. Located in the district is the separately listed Robidoux School. Other notable buildings include the First Congregational Church (1890), Francis Street Methodist Church (1905), First Baptist Church (1896) designed by architect Edmond Jacques Eckel (1845–1934), United Presbyterian Church (1901), First Church of Christ Scientist (1905), First English Evangelical Lutheran Church (1913), and Queen of the Apostles Roman Catholic Church (1908) designed by Eckel.

It was listed on the National Register of Historic Places in 1991 with a boundary increase in 2009.

References

Historic districts on the National Register of Historic Places in Missouri
Italianate architecture in Missouri
Second Empire architecture in Missouri
Queen Anne architecture in Missouri
Tudor Revival architecture in Missouri
Historic districts in St. Joseph, Missouri
National Register of Historic Places in Buchanan County, Missouri